Sir Stuart Montagu Samuel, 1st Baronet (24 October 1856 – 13 May 1926) was a British banker and Liberal politician who was Member of Parliament for Whitechapel.

Samuel was the elder brother of Herbert Samuel, 1st Viscount Samuel. He attended the Liverpool Institute and University College School, Hampstead, London. He served as Justice of the Peace for the county of London.

In 1889 he stood as a candidate for the newly formed London County Council for the Progressive Party, the municipal wing of the Liberal Party. He contested Whitechapel, and was elected with 1,523 votes, along with his running mate, Charles Tarling, who polled 1,477 votes. He served for one term, before standing down in 1892.

Samuel was selected as Liberal candidate for Whitechapel in 1900, in succession to his uncle Samuel Montagu, who had been the MP. He knew the constituency well, having represented it on the LCC. He held the seat for the Liberals with an increased majority.

In November 1902 Samuel and his wife travelled to India to attend the 1903 Delhi Durbar marking the accession of King Edward VII as Emperor of India.

When the Liberal Party won the 1906 election with a landslide, he was again returned at Whitechapel.

The Liberal Party faced the elections in 1910 against a resurgent Conservative Party. Despite this challenge, Samuel was re-elected with an increased majority, at both 1910 elections.

Over the course of four general election campaigns in Whitechapel, Samuel had increased the Liberal share of the vote each time, taking it from 50.4% to 59.2%, changing the constituency from a marginal to a safe seat.

In 1912 he was created Sir Stuart Samuel, Baronet of Chelwood Vetchery.

In April 1913 he undertook a contract for the Government, which required him to resign his seat and face re-election at a by-election. His Conservative opponent from 1910 ran against him in the by-election. He was re-elected with a reduced majority. 

Samuel retired from politics in 1916.

References

External links 
 
 Parliamentary Archives, Papers of Sir Stuart Montagu Samuel MP, 1st baronet 1856-1926

1856 births
1926 deaths
Stuart
Jewish British politicians
Baronets in the Baronetage of the United Kingdom
Liberal Party (UK) MPs for English constituencies
UK MPs 1900–1906
UK MPs 1906–1910
UK MPs 1910
UK MPs 1910–1918
Members of London County Council
Politics of the London Borough of Tower Hamlets
People educated at University College School
Politicians from Liverpool
Progressive Party (London) politicians
Presidents of the Board of Deputies of British Jews
English justices of the peace